Lophopleura sublituralis is a species of snout moth. It was described by William Warren in 1891. It is found in Brazil.

References

Moths described in 1891
Chrysauginae